Ambar Caterers is a Tulu-language comedy-drama film directed by Jaiprasad Bajal, Starring Saurabh S Bhandary and Sindhu Loknath in lead roles. The movie has been produced by Kadandale Suresh Bhandary. The movie was released on 24 Nov, 2017.

Cast
 Saurabh S Bhandary
 Sindhu Loknath
 Bharathi Vishnuvardhan
 Sharath Lohitashwa
 Bank Janardhan
 Naveen D Padil
 Bhojaraj Vamanjoor
 Aravind Bolar
 Sathish Bandale
 Sunder Rai Mandara
 Sunethra Pandit
 Manju Muloor

Soundtrack

The soundtrack of the film was composed by Manikanth Kadri. The soundtrack album was released on 29 September 2017.

References